Daira Din Panah  locally or commonly called as D. D. Panah or DDP is a union council and town near Kot Addu in the Kot Addu District of Punjab, Pakistan. It has a population of over 16 thousand. It is located in the east of the Indus River. It has a railway station, which is the main source of transport to the major cities of Pakistan.

Schools and Colleges 
 Govt. high school, Daira Din Panah 
Govt elementary school (GES), Daira Din Panah
Allied schools, Daira Din Panah
Govt boys high school, Daira Din Panah

Notable persons 
Malik Ahmad Yar Hunjra
Sultan Mehmood
Uday Bhanu Hans
Malik Ghulam Qasim Hanjra
Syed Shahbaz Ghous Bukhari

See also 
Basti Ameer Shah
Daira Din Panah Goat
Daira Din Panah Railway Station
Lashari wala Forest
Kot Addu

References 

Kot Addu District